Morgan Wallace (born Maier Weill, July 26, 1881 – December 12, 1953) was an American actor. He appeared in more than 120 films between 1914 and 1946, including W.C. Fields' It's a Gift (1934) where he persistently asks Fields for some "Kumquats". He supported Fields again in My Little Chickadee (1940).

Early life
Born in Lompoc, California, Wallace was the son of Isidore and Hannah Weill. He attended the University of California.

Career
In 1918, Wallace acted with and managed the Morgan Wallace Players in the Grand Theater in Sioux City, Iowa, and in 1927, the troupe performed in Harrisburg, Pennsylvania. In 1922, he acted in a production of Lawful Larceny at the Savoy Theatre in London, England.

Wallace's Broadway credits included Loco (1946), Congratulations (1929), Women Go On Forever (1927), Ballyhoo (1927), Gentle Grafters (1926), The Stork (1925), The Law Breaker (1922), Nature's Nobleman (1921), The Tavern (1920), The Acquittal (1920), The Widow's Might (1909), and Romeo and Juliet (1904).

In the 1930s Wallace helped found the Screen Actors Guild. He was SAG member #3.

Death
He died in December 12, 1953 at the age of 72 in Tarzana, California. He was buried in Forest Lawn Memorial Park, Glendale, California.

Selected filmography

 Gentlemen of Nerve (1914) as Spectator (film debut) 
 Tillie's Punctured Romance (1914) as Thief in 'A Thief's Fate' (uncredited)
 Bringing Up Betty (1919) as Duke of Medonia
 Flying Pat (1920) as William Endicott
 Dream Street (1921) as Masked Violinist
 Orphans of the Storm (1921) as Marquis de Praille
 One Exciting Night (1922) as J. Wilson Rockmaine
 The Hotel Mouse (1923; British film) as Honorable Harry Hurlingham
 The Fighting Blade (1923) as Lord Robert Erisey
 The Dangerous Maid (1923) as Col. Percy Kirk
 Torment (1924) as Jules Carstock
Daring Love (1924) as Jerry Hayden
 A Woman Who Sinned (1924) as George Ransdell
 Sandra (1924) as François Molyneaux
 Reckless Romance (1924) as Harold Shrewsbury
 Sisters (1930) as William Tully
 Up the River (1930) as Frosby (uncredited)
 Big Money (1930) as Durkin
 It Pays to Advertise (1931) as L.R. McChesney
 The Maltese Falcon (1931) as District Attorney (uncredited)
 Smart Money (1931) as District Attorney Black (uncredited)
 Women Go on Forever (1931) as Jake
 Alexander Hamilton (1931) as James Monroe
 Expensive Women (1931) as Arthur Raymond's Pal (uncredited)
 The Unholy Garden (1931) as Capt. Kruger (uncredited)
 The Ruling Voice (1931) as Board Member (uncredited)
 Safe in Hell (1931) as Mr. Bruno, the Hangman
 Hell's House (1932) as Frank Gebhardt
 The Final Edition (1932) as Neil Selby
 The Beast of the City (1932) as Police Captain (uncredited)
 Steady Company (1932) as Tuxedo Carter
 The Wet Parade (1932) as Bootlegger Leader (uncredited)
 Grand Hotel (1932) as Chauffeur
 The Mouthpiece (1932) as E.A. Smith
 Fast Companions (1932) as Cueball Kelly
 Lady and Gent (1932) as Cash Enright
 Blonde Venus (1932) as Dr. Pierce
 Wild Girl (1932) as Phineas Baldwin
 If I Had a Million (1932) as Mike, Jackson's Gangster Friend (uncredited)
 Central Park (1932) as District Attorney (uncredited)
 Smoke Lightning (1933) as Sheriff Archie Kyle
 Terror Aboard (1933) as Morton Hazlitt
 Jennie Gerhardt (1933) as O'Brien (uncredited)
 Mama Loves Papa (1933) as Mr. McIntosh
 The Song of Songs (1933) as Admirer (uncredited)
 Golden Harvest (1933) as Trading Center Spokesman (uncredited)
 Bombshell (1933) as H.E. Gillette (uncredited)
 The Prizefighter and the Lady (1933) as Mr. Black, Fight Promoter (uncredited)
 Above the Clouds (1933) as Chandler
 Mr. Skitch (1933) as Jones (uncredited)
 The Meanest Gal in Town (1934) as Sydney Sterling (uncredited)
 David Harum (1934) as Mr. Blake (uncredited)
 Three on a Honeymoon (1934) as Dunning (uncredited)
 I Believed in You (1934) as Oliver Lang i.e. Long
 The Trumpet Blows (1934) as Police Inspector
 Sleepers East (1934) as Prosecuting Attorney (uncredited)
 Many Happy Returns (1934) as Nathan Silas
 The Merry Widow (1934) as Prosecuting Attorney (uncredited)
 We Live Again (1934) as The Colonel
 Cheating Cheaters (1934) as Holmes
 The Third Sex (1934) as Paul Van Dyne
 College Rhythm (1934) as Broker's Manager, First Tramp (uncredited)
 It's a Gift (1934) as Jasper Fitchmueller
 Murder on a Honeymoon (1935) as McArthur, aka Arthur Mack
 The Devil Is a Woman (1935) as Dr. Mendez (uncredited)
 Goin' to Town (1935) as J. Henry Brash (uncredited)
 The Headline Woman (1935) as Clarkey
 Dante's Inferno (1935) as Capt. Morgan
 Orchids to You (1935) as Attorney (uncredited)
 Thunder Mountain (1935) as Rand Leavitt
 Confidential (1935) as H. Van Cleve
 1,000 Dollars a Minute (1935) as Big Jim Bradley
 Rendezvous (1935) as Gardner (uncredited)
 Mary Burns, Fugitive (1935) as Managing editor
 Dangerous Waters (1936) as Heegan (uncredited)
 Sutter's Gold (1936) as General Fremont
 Love on a Bet (1936) as Morton, Escaped Convict
 Robin Hood of El Dorado (1936) as Hacendado Wanting to Fight (uncredited)
 Human Cargo (1936) as Gilbert Fender
 Fury (1936) as Fred Garrett
 Mr. Cinderella (1936) as Mr. Emmett Fawcett
 House of Secrets (1936) as Dr. Kenmore
 Pennies from Heaven (1936) as Restaurant Partner (uncredited)
 Charlie Chan at the Olympics (1937) as Honorable Charles Zaraka
 The Californian (1937) as Tod Barsto
 Under Suspicion (1937) as Carey MacGregor
 The Lady in the Morgue (1938) as Layman
 Hold That Kiss (1938) as Mr. Wood, Tommy's Boss (uncredited)
 Numbered Woman (1938)
 Three Comrades (1938) as Owner of Wrecked Car (uncredited)
 Woman Against Woman (1938) as Morton
 Delinquent Parents (1938) as Charles Wharton, as an adult
 Letter of Introduction (1938) as Editor (uncredited)
 Billy the Kid Returns (1938) as J. B. Morganson
 Gang Bullets (1938) as 'Big Bill' Anderson
 Star Reporter (1939) as Joe Draper / Charles Benton
 The Mystery of Mr. Wong (1939) as Brendan Edwards
 Broadway Serenade (1939) as Mr. Park (uncredited)
 Union Pacific (1939) as Sen. Smith (uncredited)
 Timber Stampede (1939) as Dunlap
 Mr. Moto Takes a Vacation (1939) as David Perez
 The Star Maker (1939) as Lou Morris
 Parole Fixer (1940) as Ben
 My Little Chickadee (1940) as Gambler (uncredited)
 I Love You Again (1940) as Mr. Belenson
 Spring Parade (1940) as Frederick, Aide-de-Camp (uncredited)
 Three Men from Texas (1940) as Captain Andrews
 Ellery Queen, Master Detective (1940) as Zachary
 Blame It on Love (1940) as Mr. Wadsworth
 In Old Colorado (1941) as Sheriff Jack Collins
 Adventure in Washington (1941) as Senator Burrows (uncredited)
 Scattergood Meets Broadway (1941) as Reynolds
 Harmon of Michigan (1941) as Alumni Committee Man (uncredited)
 Honky Tonk (1941) as Mayor Adams (uncredited)
 Sea Raiders (1941, Serial) as Capt. Lester [Chs. 1-3, 6-7]
 Design for Scandal (1941) as Man Whose Head is Painted (uncredited)
 Gaslight (1944) as Fred Garrett (uncredited)
 Kismet (1944) as Merchant (uncredited)
 Song of the Sarong (1945) as Cyrus P. Adams
 I'll Remember April (1945) as Henry Childs
 Dick Tracy (1945) as Steve Owens
 The Falcon's Alibi (1946) as Bender (final film)

References

External links

1881 births
1953 deaths
American male film actors
American male silent film actors
20th-century American male actors
Male actors from California